The 2023 Nigerian Senate elections in Ekiti State will be held on 25 February 2023, to elect the 3 federal Senators from Ekiti State, one from each of the state's three senatorial districts. The elections will coincide with the 2023 presidential election, as well as other elections to the Senate and elections to the House of Representatives; with state elections being held two weeks later. Primaries were held between 4 April and 9 June 2022.

Background
In terms of the previous Senate elections, only one senator was returned: in the South district, Abiodun Olujimi (PDP) was re-elected after a court decision but Central Senator Fatimat Raji-Rasaki (PDP-turned-APC) lost renomination and North Senator Duro Faseyi (PDP) was unseated in the general election. In the Central district, Michael Opeyemi Bamidele held the seat for the APC with 65% of the vote and Olubunmi Ayodeji Adetunmbi (APC) defeated Faseyi with 55% in the North district; however, the South district's original results had Adebayo Clement Adeyeye winning but later court ruling awarded the win to Olujimi. These results were a part of a large swing to the Ekiti APC as every House of Representatives seat was gained by the party, it won a majority in the House of Assembly, and Buhari won the state in the presidential election.

During the 2019–2023 term, Olujimi and Bamidele both unsuccessfully ran for governor in 2022 with both withdrawing from their respective party primaries in protest of the primary conduct.

Overview

Summary

Ekiti Central 

The Ekiti Central Senatorial District covers the local government areas of Ado Ekiti, Efon, Ekiti West, Ijero Ekiti, and Irepodun/Ifelodun. Incumbent Michael Opeyemi Bamidele (APC), who was elected with 65.4% of the vote in 2019, is seeking re-election.

Primary elections

All Progressives Congress 

Before the primary, Bamidele initially faced a challenger, former Chief of Staff to Governor Kayode Fayemi Biodun Omoleye, but Omoleye later withdrew from the race. The primary in Aramoko-Ekiti in Ekiti West LGA resulted in Bamidele being renominated unopposed. After the primary, Bamidele thanked delegates along with then-Governor Kayode Fayemi, minister Niyi Adebayo, and other party leaders before vowing to help the development of the district.

People's Democratic Party 

On the primary date, Lateef Ajijola—the 2015 PDP nominee for the seat—was nominated over Henry Kayode Ojo; reports from before and after the primary stated that former Governor Ayo Fayose backed Ajijola in an attempt to reconcile the state PDP after the two politicians had previously feuded.

General election

Results

Ekiti North 

The Ekiti North Senatorial District covers the local government areas of Ido-Osi, Ikole, Ilejemeje, Moba, and Oye. Incumbent Olubunmi Ayodeji Adetunmbi (APC), who was elected with 54.7% of the vote in 2019, sought re-election but failed to be renomination by his party.

Primary elections

All Progressives Congress 

On the primary date, controversy arose over a state party directive that barred journalists from covering the primary. The primary, held in Ifaki-Ekiti in Ido-Osi LGA, was called into question by reporters due to the gag order but carried on and resulted in Adetunmbi losing to Cyril Fasuyi—a businessman who was the Director-General of the Biodun Oyebanji gubernatorial campaign organization at the time of the primary.

People's Democratic Party 

On the primary date, Funso Ayeni was nominated over former MHR Kehinde Agboola.

General election

Results

Ekiti South 

The Ekiti South Senatorial District covers the local government areas of Ekiti East, Ekiti South-West, Emure, Gbonyin, Ikere-Ekiti, and Ise/Orun. In the 2019 election, Adebayo Clement Adeyeye (APC) initially won and was sworn in as senator in June; however, his election was overturned in September and the victory awarded to Abiodun Olujimi (PDP). Olujimi is seeking re-election.

Primary elections

All Progressives Congress 

The primary in Ikere-Ekiti resulted in Raphael Adeyemi Adaramodu—member of the House of Representatives for Ekiti South West/Ikere/Ise/Orun—being nominated unopposed; prior to the primary, reports stated that Adaramodu could be backed by Governor Kayode Fayemi.

People's Democratic Party 

Before the primaries, the rift between Olujimi and former Governor Ayo Fayose (who was in effective control of the Ekiti PDP) was noted as a potential threat to Olujimi's renomination bid as several known Fayose allies had announced their candidacies. Although the Fayose-backed initially looked to be manifesting as he publicly endorsed his longtime ally—former Deputy Governor Kolapo Olushola in April 2022, the plan fell apart by the next month when Olushola accused Fayose of deceitful manipulation and withdrew from the primary. In the primary at the Bamidele Olumilua University of Education, Science and Technology in Ikere-Ekiti, the other challenger to Olujimi—another Fayose ally, former member of the House of Representatives for Ekiti South West/Ikere/Ise/Orun Segun Adekola—also withdrew so the exercise renominated Olujimi unopposed. Later reporting suggested that the withdrawal was a part of reconciliation moves between Fayose and Olujimi.

Campaign
Infighting within the state PDP greatly impacted the election campaign, especially in January 2023 when former Governor Ayo Fayose (PDP) reportedly directed his supporters to vote for Adaramodu instead of his intraparty rival Olujimi. In response, Olujimi condemned Fayose as self-centered and disrespectful. As campaign season continued into February, Fayose made his endorsement of Adaramodu public and implored local PDP members to back the APC in the senatorial race. However, pundits noted the purported support Olujimi gave to APC gubernatorial nominee Biodun Oyebanji in the 2022 Ekiti State gubernatorial election, surmising that the state APC may not fully support Adaramodu against her. Geographic factors were also noted as while Adaramodu represents the local government areas of Ekiti South-West, Ikere-Ekiti, and Ise/Orun in the House, Olujimi had a formidable base in the rest of the district along with vote-rich Ikere-Ekiti).

General election

Results

See also 
 2023 Nigerian Senate election
 2023 Nigerian elections

Notes

References 

Ekiti State senatorial elections
2023 Ekiti State elections
Ekiti State Senate elections